Our Lady of Salambáo (Spanish: Nuestra Señora de la Inmaculada Concepción de Salambáo; Tagalog: Mahal na Birhen ng Salambáo or Birheng ng Salambáw) is a Catholic title of the Blessed Virgin Mary venerated in Obando, Bulacan, Philippines. The Virgin Mary under this title is venerated as the local patroness of fishing, owing to the image's discovery in a salambáw, a type of big fishing net supported by bamboo crosspieces and mounted on a raft.

The image is enshrined with Saint Clare of Assisi and Saint Paschal Baylon inside Obando  Church. The three saints form a triad that is the focus of the annual Obando Fertility Rites held from 17 to 19 May.

Legend
The date of the image's finding is traditionally held to be 19 June 1763. Three fishermen, named Juan, Julián, and Diego dela Cruz, were fishing at a place known as Hulingduong in the town of Tambobong (today in Malabon City). There, they caught the statue with their salambáw, which is a large type of fishing lift net made from bamboo crosspieces and mounted on a raft. When the fishermen tried to bring the Virgin's image to neighbouring Navotas, their  salambáw suddenly grew heavy and immobile. They decided to head for Obando, and their raft suddenly lightened and became easy to paddle. This they took to be a sign that the Virgin wanted to be enshrined in Obando.

The image—complete with a replica salambáw—is now housed in a wooden retablo (reredos) above the high altar of San Pascual Baylón Parish, together with statues of Saint Clare and Saint Paschal. A replica of the statue, in its own salambáw, is used for the annual procession on the third day of the Rites.

Feast
The feast of Our Lady of Salambáo is on 19 May, which is the last day of a triduum honouring the triad of saints. Spread across the triduum are the Rites, which constitute Masses and processions where devotees of both sexes joyfully dance the fandango in supplication for a child and of good livelihood and harvest. The celebrations are centered on the San Pascual Baylón Parish Church, also known as the National Shrine of Nuestra Señora de la Inmaculada Concepción de Salambáo in Barangay Pag-asa, Obando, Bulacan.

Gallery

See also
Obando Fertility Rites
Our Lady of Camarin, a statue venerated on Guam that was also found by a fisherman
Our Lady of Caysasay, which was also found in a fisherman's net

References

Sources 

Philippine Fiestas & Festivals
Obando Fertility Rites
Patron Saints of Fishing (at Bunganut Lake Online)

Shrines to the Virgin Mary
Marian devotions
Titles of Mary
Catholic Church in the Philippines
Religion in Bulacan